The Fun Boy Three is the debut album by English new wave pop band the Fun Boy Three, a band consisting of three ex-members of the UK ska band the Specials: Terry Hall, Neville Staples and Lynval Golding. It was released in 1982 by Chrysalis Records and was re-released in 1999 by EMI as Fame. Several songs on the album feature backing vocals by the female pop trio Bananarama. Three singles were released from the album: "The Lunatics (Have Taken Over the Asylum)", "T'aint What You Do (It's the Way That You Do It)", and a remix (with overdubbed horns) of "The Telephone Always Rings".

Track listing 
All songs by Lynval Golding, Terry Hall and Neville Staples, except where noted.

Side one
"Sanctuary" (with Bananarama) – 1:21
"Way on Down" – 2:54
"The Lunatics (Have Taken Over the Asylum)" – 3:14
"Life in General (Lewe in Algemeen)" – 3:19
"Faith, Hope and Charity" – 2:48
"Funrama 2" (with Bananarama) – 3:08

Side two
"Best of Luck Mate" – 3:19
"T'aint What You Do (It's the Way That You Do It)" (Melvin "Sy" Oliver, James "Trummy" Young) (with Bananarama) – 2:53
"The Telephone Always Rings" – 3:39
"I Don't Believe It" – 3:26
"Alone" (with Bananarama) – 3:00

2009 "Extended Version" CD bonus tracks
"Just Do It" (with Bananarama) – 2:59
"The Funrama Theme" (Extended Version) – 6:03
"Summertime" (Extended Version) – 6:26
"Summer of '82" – 4:01
"The Telephone Always Rings" (Extended Version) – 5:34
"The Alibi (The Station's Full of Pipes)" – 2:49

Personnel 
Credits adapted from 2009 "Extended Version" liner notes.

The Fun Boy Three
– all instruments and vocals
Terry Hall
Neville Staples
Lynval Golding

Bananarama
– featured vocals (tracks 1, 6, 8, 11)
Siobhan Fahey
Keren Woodward
Sara Dallin

Additional musicians
Dick Cuthell – the horn player
Sean Carasov – on the telephone

Technical
Dave Jordan – producer
The Fun Boy Three – producers, arrangers
Allan Ballard – cameraman
John Teflon Sims – visual effects
Frank Elton – screen illustrations
Terry Day – cover colour effects

Charts

References 

1982 debut albums
Fun Boy Three albums
Chrysalis Records albums